Kim Pyung-seok (born 22 September 1958) is retired football player and manager.

He played in K League side Hyundai Horang-i and Yukong Elephants in South Korea.

Early life
He started football when he was high school student. He graduated from Yeoido High School, but since the school did not have a football team, he enrolled in another high school, namely Kwangwoon Electronic Technical High School.

He graduated from Kwangwoon Electronic Technical High School, he failed to entrance into a school. He joined the now defunct Nong Hyup FC and played. Two years later, he joined the navy for military duty, and then joined navy football team.

After he was discharged from military service in October 1981, he entered Kwangwoon University. When he was sophomore, his team won the university championship tournament.

Playing career
He left university without graduating when his team won the championship, he joined K League side Hyundai Horang-i. He played for Hyundai Horang-i in K League, he appeared in 83 games. In 1989, he moved to Yukong Elephants and one year later he retired.

His main position was left full back and sometimes played as a central defender and central midfielder.
He was member of South Korea in 1983–1987.

Managerial career
He participated 1998 FIFA World Cup for South Korea coach. But he managed to last game of South Korea due to manager Cha Bum-kun was replacement by defeat against Netherlands resulted 0–5. Last game against Belgium resulted draw by 1–1.

Come back to South Korea, he managed high school football team quite long. Also he coached Cha Bum-kun Youth Academy. From 1996 to 1999, he managed South Korean women's football team that Incheon Steel WFC.

Club career statistics

References

 맨투맨 수비의 1인자 '족쇄' 김평석

External links

1958 births
Living people
Association football defenders
South Korean footballers
South Korea international footballers
South Korean football managers
Ulsan Hyundai FC players
Jeju United FC players
K League 1 players
1984 AFC Asian Cup players
1986 FIFA World Cup players
1998 FIFA World Cup managers
Ulsan Hyundai FC managers
Asian Games medalists in football
Footballers at the 1986 Asian Games
Asian Games gold medalists for South Korea
Medalists at the 1986 Asian Games
Kwangwoon University alumni